Portland Japanese School (PJS; ポートランド日本人学校 Pōtorando Nihonjin Gakkō) is a Japanese weekend supplementary school located in the Portland metropolitan area. The school has its office in Park Plaza West in Beaverton, and its classes are held at Hazelbrook Middle School in Tualatin. The Japanese Business Association of Portland (ポートランド日本人商工会 Pōtorando Nihonjin Shōkōkai), also known as the "Shokookai," oversees the school, which serves levels PK through 12.

History
It was founded in August 1971. During the 1980s the school was meeting in Twality Middle School in Tigard as the PJS began its relationship with the Tigard-Tualatin School District. When Hazelbrook Middle School opened in 1992 the Japanese school moved its classes there. In 2000 the school had about 280 students.

Curriculum and operations
The school teaches kokugo (Japanese language) and mathematics.

Every summer the Japanese school sends some Tigard-Tualatin school employees to Japan so they can study Japanese culture.

Student demographics
As of 2011 the school had 363 students. Students originate from the Portland area, with a portion coming from Salem, Oregon and Longview, Washington. Many of their parents are businesspersons temporarily residing in the United States.

References
  Kajita, Masami (梶田 正巳) and Saiko Hayashi (早矢仕 彩子 Hayashi Saiko; Mie University 人文学部). "Adaptation of Japanese Students in Portland Japanese School : Language, Academic Achievement and Identity" (Archive; ポートランド日本語補習授業校の子ども達の異文化適応 : 学習・言語・アイデン ティティ面から). Bulletin of the Graduate School of Education and Human Development - Psychology and Human Developmental Sciences. 47, 1-23, 2000–12. Nagoya University. See profile at CiNii. English abstract available.

Notes

External links
  Portland Japanese School
 Japanese Business Association of Portland

Japanese-American culture in Portland, Oregon
Schools in Oregon
Education in Portland, Oregon
1971 establishments in Oregon
Educational institutions established in 1971
Portland
Tualatin, Oregon